House I is a sculpture by Roy Lichtenstein. It has an illusion, which makes it appear inside out, or normally, depending on which way the viewer sees it.

It is located at the National Gallery of Art Sculpture Garden.

It was constructed of painted aluminum, modeled in 1996 and constructed in 1999.

Among his last works, it was a part of the House series (Lichtenstein). House II was shown at the Venice Biennale in 1997, and House III was shown at the Metropolitan Museum of Art.

Illusion 
The house uses optical illusion to play with perspective. To appreciate the full effect, walk at a steady rate along the arc of the sidewalk that runs in front of and nearly perpendicular to the sculpture, with your head turned to one side, facing the sculpture. The house will appear to be spinning in space.

See also
 1996 in art
 List of public art in Washington, D.C., Ward 2

References

External links
Lichtenstein Foundation
Roy Lichtenstein’s Optical Illusion Sculpture
"The Deceptive House of Roy Lichtenstein"  
Virtual Globetrotting

Sculptures by Roy Lichtenstein
1999 sculptures
National Gallery of Art Sculpture Garden
Collections of the National Gallery of Art
Aluminum sculptures in Washington, D.C.
Outdoor sculptures in Washington, D.C.
1999 establishments in Washington, D.C.